In enzymology, a lipopolysaccharide N-acetylmannosaminouronosyltransferase is an enzyme that catalyzes the chemical reaction

UDP-N-acetyl-beta-D-mannosaminouronate + lipopolysaccharide  UDP + N-acetyl-beta-D-mannosaminouronosyl-1,4-lipopolysaccharide

Thus, the two substrates of this enzyme are UDP-N-acetyl-beta-D-mannosaminouronate and lipopolysaccharide, whereas its two products are UDP and N-acetyl-beta-D-mannosaminouronosyl-1,4-lipopolysaccharide.

This enzyme belongs to the family of glycosyltransferases, specifically the hexosyltransferases.  The systematic name of this enzyme class is UDP-N-acetyl-beta-D-mannosaminouronate:lipopolysaccharide N-acetyl-beta-D-mannosaminouronosyltransferase. Other names in common use include ManNAcA transferase, uridine-diphosphoacetylmannosaminuronatetranferase, N-acetylglucosaminylpyrophosphorylundecaprenol  glucosyltransferase, and acetylmannosaminuronosyltransferase.

References

 

EC 2.4.1
Enzymes of unknown structure